Graham Petrie (born 1939) is a retired Scottish-Canadian academic and writer, most notably a literature and film studies professor at McMaster University in Hamilton, Ontario.

He was born in Penang, Malaya to Scottish parents, and was raised and educated primarily in Scotland. He initially joined McMaster as a professor of English, with his academic focus evolving toward film during his time with the institution.

In addition to his academic works he published the novel Seahorse in 1980, and was a shortlisted nominee for the Books in Canada First Novel Award in 1981. In 1996, Soho Press published his second novel The Siege simultaneously with a reissue of Seahorse. He also published the short story "Village Theatre" in John Robert Colombo's 1981 anthology Not to Be Taken at Night.

Works

Nonfiction
The Cinema of François Truffaut (1970)
History Must Answer to Man: The Contemporary Hungarian Cinema (1981)
Hollywood Destinies: European Directors in America, 1922-1931 (1986)
Before the Wall Came Down: Soviet and East European Filmmakers Working in the West (1990)

Fiction
Seahorse (1980)
The Siege (1995)

References

1939 births
20th-century Canadian novelists
Canadian male novelists
Canadian film historians
Academic staff of McMaster University
Scottish emigrants to Canada
People from Penang
Living people
20th-century Canadian short story writers
Canadian male short story writers
20th-century Canadian male writers
Canadian male non-fiction writers